The government of Luis Carrero Blanco was formed on 12 June 1973, following his appointment and swearing-in as Prime Minister of Spain on 9 June by Head of State Francisco Franco, who for the first time since 1938 had chosen to detach the figure of the head of government from that he held of head of state.

Carrero Blanco's cabinet was made up of members from the different factions or "families" within the National Movement: mainly the FET y de las JONS party—the only legal political party during the Francoist regime—the military and the Opus Dei, as well as a number of aligned-nonpartisan technocrats or figures from the civil service. The government would be disestablished following the assassination of Luis Carrero Blanco in Madrid by the Basque separatist group ETA on 20 December 1973, only six months into his term, being temporarily replaced in acting capacity by his deputy Torcuato Fernández-Miranda until a Carlos Arias Navarro was chosen as new prime minister. Under the regulations of the Organic Law of the State of 1967, all government ministers were automatically dismissed on 31 December upon the appointment of the new prime minister, but remained in acting capacity until the next government was sworn in.

Council of Ministers
The Council of Ministers was structured into the offices for the prime minister, the deputy prime minister and 19 ministries.

Notes

References

Bibliography

External links
Governments. Dictatorship of Franco (18.07.1936 / 20.11.1975). CCHS–CSIC (in Spanish).
Governments of Franco. Dictatorship Chronology (1939–1975). Fuenterrebollo Portal (in Spanish).
The governments of the Civil War and Franco's dictatorship (1936–1975). Lluís Belenes i Rodríguez History Page (in Spanish).
Biographies. Royal Academy of History (in Spanish).

1973 establishments in Spain
1973 disestablishments in Spain
Cabinets established in 1973
Cabinets disestablished in 1973
Council of Ministers (Spain)